Gokana Assembly constituency is a constituency of the Rivers State House of Assembly, Nigeria.

Members of the House of Assembly
1999: Hon. Magnus Ngei Abe(Bera)
2003: Hon. Gabriel Pidomson (Bodo)
2007: Hon. Barinyima Badom (B. Dere)
2011: Hon. Innocent Barikor (Bomu)
2019: Hon. Dumle Maol  (B. Dere)

References

Assembly constituencies of Rivers State